Lucasium woodwardi, the Pilbara ground gecko, is a gecko endemic to Australia which is found in Western Australia.

References

Lucasium
Reptiles described in 1914
Taxa named by Dene Barrett Fry
Geckos of Australia